Dalankuh Rural District is a rural district (dehestan) in the Central District of Faridan County, Isfahan Province, Iran. At the 2006 census, its population was 3,971, in 995 families.  The rural district has 3 villages.

References 

Rural Districts of Isfahan Province
Faridan County